Ty Burns is an American politician, educator, former law enforcement officer, and retired United States Army infantryman serving as a member of the Oklahoma House of Representatives from the 35th district. Elected in November 2018, he assumed office on November 21, 2018.

Early life and education 
Burns was raised on a farm in Pawnee County, Oklahoma. He graduated from Pawnee High School and earned a bachelor's degree from Oklahoma State University–Stillwater.

Career 
Burns served in the United States Army for 20 years, retiring with the rank of Sergeant First Class. Burns was an infantryman in the War in Afghanistan and Iraq War as a member of the 45th Infantry Brigade. After retiring from the military, Burns served as a sheriff's deputy for six years. He has since worked as a football and wrestling coach for Ponca City Public Schools. He and his wife, Staci, own and operate a ranch. Burns was elected to the Oklahoma House of Representatives in November 2018.

During the 2019–2020 legislative session, Burns served as vice chair of the House Veterans and Military Affairs Committee. In the 2021–2022 session, he is chair of the House Wildlife Committee. After the 2020 United States presidential election, Burns signed a letter, along with other members of the Oklahoma Legislature, urging Oklahoma's congressional delegation to challenge certification of the state's Electoral College votes.

References 

Living people
People from Pawnee County, Oklahoma
Oklahoma State University alumni
Republican Party members of the Oklahoma House of Representatives
21st-century American politicians
Year of birth missing (living people)